Lakshmikutty ( Malayalam: ലക്ഷ്മിക്കുട്ടി , born 1943) is a tribal woman from Kallar forest area at Thiruvananthapuram in Kerala, India who received the India's fourth highest civilian honour Padma Shri for her breakthrough in practicing traditional medicine.

Early life
Lakshmikutty is a famous poison healer practicing traditional medicine. She also received Kerala Government's Naattu Vaidya Ratna award in 1995. She is practicing traditional medicine for over 50 years.

She belongs to Kaani tribe and can remember more than 500 varieties of medicine. She has attained the education of 3rd forum and knows Sanskrit. She also writes poems, dramas and is a teacher in Kerala Folklore Academy.

Prime Minister Narendra Modi spoke about Lakshmikutty's contributions in his monthly Mann Ki Baat radio programme. People fondly refer to her as ‘Vanamuthassi’ (Grandmother of the jungle in Malayalam) and she gives lectures on natural medicine at various institutions across the southern states.

References

Living people
People from Thiruvananthapuram
1943 births
Recipients of the Padma Shri in medicine
Traditional medicine practitioners
Traditional medicine in India
Malayalam poets